Hifazat may refer to:

Hifazat (1973 film)
Hifazat (1987 film)
Hifazat (1990 film), starring Abid Ali